Howard George Tripp (3 July 1927 – 3 October 2022) was a British Roman Catholic prelate.

Tripp was born in England and was ordained to the priesthood in 1953. He served as titular bishop of Neoportus and was auxiliary bishop of the Archdiocese of Southwark, England, from 1980 until his retirement in 2004.  As an auxiliary bishop of Southwark, he had particular oversight of the deaneries of the archdiocese in South West London.

Tripp died on 3 October 2022, at the age of 95.

References

1927 births
2022 deaths
People from Croydon
20th-century Roman Catholic bishops in England
21st-century Roman Catholic bishops in England
Bishops appointed by Pope John Paul II
Roman Catholic bishops of Southwark